Stenelmis knobeli is a species of endangered beetles. Its common name is Knobel's riffle beetle.

References

Byrrhoidea
Beetles described in 1938